is a Japanese restaurant staff and retired actor. He is known for portraying Mutsuki Kamijo / Kamen Rider Leangle in Kamen Rider Blade. According to his Blade co-star Ryoji Morimoto, Takahiro has retired from his acting career and currently moves to work at a restaurant in Nagoya. However, despite the cases, he reprised his role as Kamen Rider Leangle in Super Hero Taisen GP: Kamen Rider 3, though only providing his voice.

Filmography

 Mayonaka wa Betsu no Kao (2002) 
 Water Boys (2003) as Chiba
 Kamen Rider Blade (2005-2005) as Mutsuki Kamijo / Kamen Rider Leangle
 Kamen Rider Blade: Missing Ace (2004) as Mutsuki Kamijo / Kamen Rider Leangle
 H2 ~ Kimi to Ita Hibi (2005) as Shūji Sagawa
 Life (2007) as Yūki Sonoda
 Q.E.D. (2009) as Kunihiko Sendagawa
 Drifting Net Cafe (2009) as Takashi Matsuda

Video games
Kamen Rider Blade (2004) as Kamen Rider Leangle
 Kamen Rider: Super Climax Heroes (2012) as Kamen Rider Leangle
 Kamen Rider Summon Ride! (2014) as Kamen Rider Leangle

External links
 
 Photos Album

Living people
1986 births
Japanese male television actors
Japanese male child actors
Japanese male musicians
Japanese musicians
Actors from Aichi Prefecture
Musicians from Aichi Prefecture